Verdict is a British television legal anthology series, first broadcast on 31 July 1998, that ran for four episodes on ITV. The series, set entirely in the courtroom, features genuine members of the public as the jury, who give their verdict on each of the cases presented before them. Each episode features an entirely unique cast, with the exception of Susan Duerden, whose character, Heather Smart, appears in two of the four episodes. The series' format drew comparisons with fellow ITV counterpart Crown Court, which ran from 1972 until 1984.

The series was directed by Michael Kerrigan, Mike Adams and Bill Pryde; with Catherine Hayes, Tom Needham, Susan Rogers and Chris Thompson acting as principal writers. Aside from a single repeat run on ITV3 in the late 2000s, the series has never been re-broadcast or released on DVD.

Cast

Split Second
 John Bowe as Richard Prestwick Q.C.
 Sarah Lancashire as Anne Cloves Q.C. 
 John Bowler as PC Eddie Smith 
 Richard Baglow as Tim Horton-Smith 
 Richard Dillane as Robert Horton-Smith 
 Stella Gonet as Alex Horton-Smith 
 Hannah Nadry as Alice Horton-Smith 
 Susan Duerden as Heather Smart 
 Terrence Hardiman as James MacKenzie 
 John Woodvine as Judge Peregrine Horner

Neighbours from Hell
 Keith Barron as Malcolm Davies Q.C. 
 David Robb as Hugh Murray Q.C. 
 Idris Elba as PC Brian Rawlinson 
 June Brown as Amelia Sayers 
 Michelle Collins as Camille Backhouse 
 Alan Halsall as Joseph Backhouse 
 Ian Curtis as James Loman 
 Joe Jacobs as Adam Swift 
 Marian McLoughlin as Jane McHugh 
 Edward Hardwicke as Judge John Harrison

The Doctor's Opinion
 Ace Bhatti as Sanjay Mehta Q.C.
 Sue Johnston as Hazel De Vere Q.C. 
 Katie Blake as Eden Barrow 
 Ken Drury as Dr. Richard Bard 
 John Duttine as Dr. Matthew Dixon 
 Emily Hamilton as Sarah Dixon 
 Emilia Fox as Charlie Moyes 
 Georgia Goodman as Nicola Burns 
 Mel Martin as Tina Paul 
 Jason Merrells as Ben Clayton 
 Ann Mitchell as Judge Jane Harrison

Be My Valentine
 Jonathan Barlow as Keith Durban 
 Haydn Gwynne as Lynn Durban 
 Tracie Bennett as Sally Taylor 
 Peter Davison as Michael Naylor 
 Susan Duerden as Heather Smart 
 David Fleeshman as Bernard Michaelson 
 Jan Francis as Kathryn Lewis 
 Bernard Gallagher as Dr. Daniel Marsden 
 Judy Holt as Rosemary Wyatt 
 Barrie Rutter as Andrew McIntyre 
 Martin Walsh as Terry Watson
 Wanda Ventham as Judge Beverley Conran

Episodes

References

External links

1998 British television series debuts
1998 British television series endings
1990s British drama television series
ITV television dramas
1990s British legal television series
1990s British television miniseries
Television series by ITV Studios
Television series by Yorkshire Television
English-language television shows